Rachelle Henry (born December 16, 2000) is an American actress  and filmmaker. She played the role of Sandy Hobbs in the TLC (TV network) Series Escaping the Prophet and Lissa Golaski in Depth, the film prequel to the Soma (video game) by Frictional Games. She is also known for directing and producing short films containing messages of social influence and coming of age themes including Missing, Defining Moments, and Almost Boyfriends.

Early life and career
Rachelle Henry was born on December 16, 2000 in Richland, Washington and raised in Seattle. She began acting, modeling and training at the age of 6 and was cast in the title role of Twelfth Night Productions' Oliver! at the age of 10. Soon after, she began to appear regularly in television commercials and independent films throughout the Pacific Northwest.

At age 15, Henry won a grant from Adobe Systems to produce a project about social change as part of the Adobe Pitch Project in association with Reel Grrls. She produced and directed the short film Missing for which she won the Best Director Award at the 2016 Premio Cinematographico Palena Film Festival in Palena, Italy and Best Short Film with a Social Message at the 2016 NEZ International Film Festival in Kolkata, India.

Henry was nominated in two categories at the 38th Young Artist Academy Awards and won the award for "Best Performance in a Short Film – Teen Actress" on March 17, 2017 for her work as Daisy in the short film, Jersey Gurl. That same week, The Young Entertainer Awards named Rachelle "Best Young Actress in a Short Film" for her portrayal as Alex, a young pick pocket in the film Grifters which she also produced. In 2019 she was named Best Young Actress for her work in the film Mehndi which premiered at the Seattle International Film Festival and was an official selection at the Outfest Film Festival in Los Angeles. She was nominated in four categories for the 40th Young Artist Academy Awards and was the first recipient of the award for Best Producer.

Henry co-starred in several film festival projects including Creased, featured at the San Diego Asian Film Festival 2016 and the HollyShorts Film Festival,  Losing It, which premiered at the Slamdance Film Festival as well as the Cannes Film Festival Short Film Corner, and as the alter ego of the Capitol Hill Massacre killer in the 2017 film Wallflower which premiered at the Seattle International Film Festival in June 2017. In 2018, Henry appeared alongside Willow Shields (The Hunger Games) and Meg DeLacy (The Fosters) in the feature film Woodstock or Bust which was named Best Feature Film at the Artetmis Film Festival at the Laemmle Theater. The same year, Rachelle played Molly in the feature film, My Summer as a Goth, for which she earned a nomination for best supporting actress.

In 2019, Henry co-starred as Lisa Hunt, oldest daughter of Watergate mastermind E. Howard Hunt, in the Starz Watergate era television series Gaslit starring Sean Penn, Julia Roberts and Dan Stevens. In 2022, she joined the cast of the Netflix series Dead to Me, starring Christina Applegate and Linda Cardellini. Henry plays a young woman with a background and demeanor reminiscent of young Jen Harding (Applegate), who is helping her mother navigating a battle with cancer.   She appears in hospital flashbacks reminding Jen of a difficult period in her own life, while her friend Judy (Cardellini) undergoes chemotherapy in an adjacent hospital room.  In 2022, Henry was cast in the role of Annie, who befriends runaway protagonist Dina Fox, in Justin Theroux’s Apple TV+ series The Mosquito Coast.  

Henry was named Junior Editor at We Blab Entertainment Magazine in 2017. She regularly conducts interviews with fellow entertainment personalities. She is often invited to sit on discussion panels speaking to young artists who are seeking to advance their careers. She addresses civic groups promoting positive student development programs and works as a representative of youth who, while unable to vote, wish to have a voice in legislation pertaining to their future.

Philanthropy
Henry is an avid supporter of animal rescue organizations such as Emerald City Pet Rescue and P.A.W.S. She also supports organizations benefitting women and children who are fighting cancer through her participation in 5K Runs sponsored by Women of Wonder and Run of Hope. Charities include organizations such as The Seattle Children's Hospital and Team Survivor.

Filmography

Film (Director)

Film

Television

Awards and nominations

References

External links
 
 
 
 

Living people
2000 births
21st-century American actresses
Actresses from Los Angeles
Actresses from Seattle
American child actresses
American film actresses
American women film directors
American women film producers
People from Richland, Washington